Steven Paul Griffiths (born 25 May 1962) is a former Australian politician. He was a member of the South Australian House of Assembly from 2006 to 2018, representing the electorate of Goyder for the Liberal Party. He was the Deputy leader of the opposition under Isobel Redmond from 2009 to 2010.

Biography
Griffiths was elected to the safe Liberal seat of Goyder at the 2006 state election to replace retiring sitting member John Meier. Griffiths was elected with a margin of 9.1 points, suffering a 7.1-point swing. Griffiths has held shadow ministries since 2007, and in 2009 was elected to the deputy leadership of his party with Isobel Redmond being elected to the leadership.

On Tuesday 30 March 2010, Griffiths was replaced by former leader Martin Hamilton-Smith as deputy.

Griffiths announced on 14 February 2017 that he would be retiring from parliament as of the 2018 election.

References

External links
 Poll Bludger article

1962 births
Living people
Members of the South Australian House of Assembly
Liberal Party of Australia members of the Parliament of South Australia
21st-century Australian politicians